{{DISPLAYTITLE:C18H16O6}}
The molecular formula C18H16O6 (molar mass: 328.32 g/mol, exact mass: 328.094688 u) may refer to:

 Alnetin, a flavone
 Biliatresone
 Salvigenin, a flavone
 Vermistatin